Gibbens is a surname. Notable people with the surname include:

 Barney Gibbens (1935–2012), British businessman
 Craig Gibbens (born 1965), English cricketer
 Jack Gibbens (born 1998), American football player
 Kevin Gibbens (born 1979), English footballer
 Nigel Gibbens (born 1958), British veterinarian and civil servant
 Wayne Gibbens (born 1937), American politician